Świątek is a Polish surname. Notable people with the surname include:

 Adrian Świątek (born 1986), Polish footballer
 Andrzej Świątek (born 1958), Polish ice hockey player
 Iga Świątek (born 2001), Polish tennis player
 Kazimierz Świątek (1914–2011), Polish Roman Catholic cardinal
 Roman Świątek (Roman Świątkiewicz, born 1928), Polish writer
 Tadeusz Świątek (born 1961), Polish footballer
 Taryn Swiatek (born 1981), Canadian soccer goalkeeper
 Tomasz Świątek (born 1964), Polish rower
 Władysław Świątek (1897–1930), Polish sports shooter

See also
 

Polish-language surnames